Lectionary 186, designated by siglum ℓ 186 (in the Gregory-Aland numbering) is a Greek manuscript of the New Testament, on parchment leaves. Palaeographically it has been assigned to the 11th century.
Scrivener labelled it by 221e.

Description 

The codex contains Lessons from the Gospels of John, Matthew, Luke lectionary (Evangelistarium), on 218 parchment leaves, with lacunae.
The text is written in Greek minuscule letters, in two columns per page, 20 lines per page, in beautiful bold minuscule letters. The headings in gold capitals, initials in gold colours. It contains illuminations and musical notes in red.

There are daily lessons from Easter to Pentecost.

History 

The manuscript once was in possession of Thomas Gale (1636–1702) along with Minuscule 66.

It was examined by Scrivener, who added it to the list of New Testament manuscripts. Gregory saw it in 1883.

The manuscript is not cited in the critical editions of the Greek New Testament (UBS3).

Currently the codex is located in the Trinity College (O. IV. 22) at Cambridge.

See also 

 List of New Testament lectionaries
 Biblical manuscript
 Textual criticism

Notes and references

Bibliography 

 F. H. A. Scrivener, Adversaria critica Sacra (Cambridge 1893), p. 14.

External links 
 Lectionary 186 at the Trinity College Library Cambridge

Greek New Testament lectionaries
11th-century biblical manuscripts
Manuscripts in Cambridge